The Al Kathiri is a royal family that has had strong influence in the south of the Arabian Peninsula. It is one of the largest tribes of Banu Dhanna ibn Haram in eastern Yemen and Oman, with populations in Saudi Arabia, Qatar, United Arab Emirates, and East African countries such as  Somalia and Kenya and Tanzania.
However, there are two tribes of Al Kathiri one is Banu Dhanna and one is Banu Lam tribe, which is descendant from Tai tribe is located in Najd - northern Saudi Arabia - Kuwait - Iraq, and branched to Al Kathran (الكثران), Al Mughira (المغيرة), Al Fadhuol (الفظول) and Al Dhafeer (الظفير).

Al-Kathiri Family and Al-Kathiri Sultanate
Al-Kathiri Family and the Al-Kathiri Sultanate formed a natural extension of Banu Nahed leaders since the pre-Islamic era till the near past. Therefore, the leadership inherited in them and molded them because of what they have touched on the ancestors of the top leadership, mastery and the presidency. The Al Kathiri or Sultanate Al Kathir extended to Dhofar and Shabwa in the east to the west and north into the Empty Quarter and south to the seashore of the Arabian Sea, particularly the city of Shahr. Most of the Hadhrami tribes were under the protection of Sultanate Al Kathiri, but there were some tribes that rebelled such as Alhmoum, Sheikh Al Amoudi and Yafa, however Sultanate was able to overcome these challenges.

Sultanate Qu'aiti emerged at the beginning of the 19th century with the Britain support and shared Sultanate Alkatiri in ruling. The north and the east of Hadramout remained under the control of Alkathiri and the west became with Qu'aiti. The two Sultanates entered in long wars lasted for 100 years till they reconciled and signed a treaty under the superintendence of the British colonial in 1937 AD in the palace of the Sultan Al Kathiri in Seiyoun, Alkatiri's capital. Signing the agreements was attended too by other Hadhrami tribes such as Nahed, Awamer, Sei’ar and Alhmoum as well as Yafa tribe.

As a result of these long years of wars to expand the influence and gain control, many of the stages and the details of Al Kathiri history and their Sultanate was hidden and did not stand out enough.

Home of Al Kathir Tribes

Al Kathiri live in several regions in Yemen, Oman, the United Arab Emirates, Saudi Arabia and Qatar. However, they mainly populate Hadramout and Mahara provinces in Yemen, and the province of Dhofar in Oman. They also have presence in Southeast Asia and East Africa. Omar Ba Omar ( آل عمر باعمر ) are an example of the presence of Al Kathiri in Eastern Africa specifically Somalia in cities such as Mogadishu, Merca, Baraawe, Diinsor.

The most important areas of Al Kathir tribe in Hadhramaut are Seiyoun, Shibam, Tarim, Ned Al Kathir (Quff), Sah, Sheil Djaima, Algarah, Alhazem, Alghurfa, Almasila, Alardh, Aradh Al-Abdullah, Tris, Alghuraf, Mdodh, Redood, Shahar, Eynat, Alhota, Mukalla and Al-Jawf, Thamood, Buhyra, Faret, Al Fez Castle, Algufel, Al Aas Castle, Aredh AlSuqair, Sheil Shibam, Almahjar, Almsial and Wadi Sir, Ajlanyh, Albeda, Jahz, Saleel Al Kathir, Wadi Ben Ali, Wadi Ne'aam, Wadi Sh'houh, Rydat bin Abdel-Wadood, Gosaiar and the coast of Hadramout.

References

Tribes of Arabia
Yemeni tribes